William "Bill" D. Green (born August 1953) is an American business executive. He was the executive chairman of the global Accenture management consulting firm.

Early life 
Green was raised in Hampden, Massachusetts and did odd jobs managing horses, assisting electricians, and in construction.  He was the first in his family to attain a college education, graduating from Dean College before attaining a degree in economics from Babson College and later an MBA from the same institution.

Accenture 
Green joined Accenture, then part of Andersen Consulting, in 1977 right out of college.  He has held the chief operating officer position as well as being the chief executive of the resource operating group.  He was a key part of the split from Andersen Worldwide Société Coopérative that led to the incorporation of Accenture.

He became the CEO on September 1, 2004. In 2009, Green drew a base salary of $1,237,500, with a total compensation of $18,277,099 including stock awards and incentives. Green retired from his position as CEO, effective January 1, 2011, and was replaced by Pierre Nanterme.  Green retained his position as executive chairman of Accenture. On October 22, 2012, Accenture announced that Green will step down as chairman in February 2013 and retire from Accenture. CEO Pierre Nanterme will succeed Green as chairman.

On May 10, 2022, Green joined the board of BMC Software as chair.

References 

Living people
Accenture people
American chief executives
Dean College alumni
Babson College alumni
1953 births
20th-century American businesspeople
People from Hampden, Massachusetts